The President's Analyst is a 1967 American satirical black comedy film written and directed by Ted Flicker and starring James Coburn. The film has elements of political satire and science fiction, including themes concerning modern ethics and privacy, specifically the intrusion of the telecommunications monopoly, working with the U.S. government, into citizens' private lives. The film was released theatrically on December 21, 1967, and was initially not a commercial success. However, it was reviewed favorably and eventually achieved cult status.

Plot
Psychiatrist Dr. Sidney Schaefer is chosen by the U.S. government to act as the president's top-secret personal psychoanalyst, from a referral by Don Masters, a Central Enquiries Agency (CEA) assassin who vetted Schaefer while undergoing his own psychoanalysis. The decision to choose Schaefer is against the advice of Henry Lux, the diminutive director of the all-male Federal Bureau of Regulation (FBR). ("Lux" resembles "Electrolux," which like "Hoover", was once a famous make of vacuum cleaner.) Schaefer is given a home in affluent Georgetown and assigned a comfortable office connected to the White House by a secret tunnel. From this location he is to be on call at all hours, to fit the president's hectic schedule.

However, the president's analyst has a unique problem: there is no one with whom he can talk about the president's top-secret and personal problems. As he steadily becomes overwhelmed by stress, Schaefer begins to feel that he is being watched everywhere until he becomes clinically paranoid; he even suspects his sweet girlfriend Nan of spying on him as an agent of the CEA. All of Schaefer's paranoid suspicions eventually turn out to be true. Still worse, Schaefer has a habit of talking in his sleep.

Schaefer goes on the run with the help of a "typical" American family in New Jersey who defend him against foreign agents attempting to kidnap him off the street. He escapes with the help of a hippie tribe led by the "Old Wrangler", as spies from many nations attempt to kidnap him for the secret information that the president has disclosed to him. Meanwhile, agents from the FBR seek him on orders to '"liquidate" him as a national security risk. Eventually, Schaefer is found and kidnapped by Canadian Secret Service agents masquerading as a British pop group. Schaefer is rescued from the Canadians and an FBR assassin by Kropotkin (Severn Darden), a Russian KGB agent who intends to spirit him away to the Soviet Union. Kropotkin has second thoughts about his plan following a psychoanalysis session with the doctor during which Kropotkin begins to come to terms with his unrealized hatred of his KGB-chief father for having his mother shot during Joseph Stalin's Purge of 1937. Now feeling that he needs the doctor's help to continue his self-analysis, he instead returns him to U.S. soil.

Kropotkin arranges a pickup with his trusted CEA colleague Don Masters, but Schaefer is kidnapped again, this time by TPC (The Phone Company), a far more insidious organization than the CSS, the FBR, or the KGB, which had been secretly observing him. Taken to TPC headquarters in New Jersey, he is introduced to its leader, who wants Schaefer's help in carrying out their plan for world domination. As the TPC leader makes his presentation, a camera closeup reveals electronic cables connected to one of his feet, revealing that he is actually an animatronic robot.

TPC has developed a "modern electronic miracle", the Cerebrum Communicator (CC), a microelectronic device that can communicate wirelessly with any other CC in the world. With the CC implanted in the brain, a user need only think of the phone number to be called, and is instantly connected, thus eliminating the need for The Phone Company's massive and expensive wired infrastructure. For this to work, every human being will be assigned a number instead of a name, and will have the CC implanted prenatally. Schaefer is to be forced to assist the TPC scheme by blackmailing the president to pushing through the required legislation. TPC uses a short animated sequence (a parody of the animation in Our Mr. Sun) to explain the plan to Schaefer.

Masters and Kropotkin use their superspy abilities to come to Schaefer's rescue. They hand Schaefer an M16 rifle that he gleefully uses on The Phone Company's security staff. The trio emerge victorious from the ensuing bloodbath, but months later, as Schaefer and his spy friends are enjoying a Christmas reunion, animatronic executives from TPC are seen staring approvingly at a secret monitor, while "Joy to the World" plays in the background.

Cast

 James Coburn as Dr. Sidney Schaefer
 Godfrey Cambridge as Don Masters
 Severn Darden as V. I. Kydor Kropotkin
 Joan Delaney as Nan Butler
 Pat Harrington, Jr. as Arlington Hewes
 Barry McGuire as Old Wrangler
 Jill Banner as Snow White
 Eduard Franz as Ethan Allan Cocket
 Walter Burke as Henry Lux
 Will Geer as Dr. Lee Evan
 William Daniels as Wynn Quantrill
 Joan Darling as Jeff Quantrill
 Sheldon Collins as Bing Quantrill
 Arte Johnson as Sullivan
 Martin Horsey as 1st Puddlian

Production
James Coburn first met Theodore Flicker on the set of Charade where the screenwriter was visiting his colleague and friend Peter Stone. Years later, Flicker met Coburn at a Christmas party, where he showed Coburn the script of a film that the screenwriter wished to direct. Coburn had just made Waterhole #3 for Paramount, and showed the script to Robert Evans, who loved it. A deal for production was made in five days. It was the first movie Evans greenlit as the new head of Paramount Studios.

The film was shot in New York City and the Paramount Studios in Los Angeles. Evans claimed that during production of the film, he was visited by FBI agents who told him that the agency did not want the film to be made because of its unflattering portrayal of the FBI. Evans refused, but when pressured by his studio, he changed the "FBI" to "FBR", and "CIA" to "CEA" by redubbing the voice track slightly out of sync. Evans believed that his telephone was monitored by the FBI (or the phone company) from that point on. The film's opening credits include a disclaimer that it was made without cooperation from the FBI or CIA.

The musical band of hippies led by McGuire was a Los Angeles rock group called Clear Light. They evolved from the band Brain Train and had recently been signed to Elektra Records when they were cast in the film, with a few band members given lines of dialogue. However, the band soon replaced its vocalist. (Cliff DeYoung joined the band as singer after the film was made and was their lead singer on their sole album; McGuire had played that part in the film.) The band released just one album and three singles before breaking up. Reportedly, the role was originally offered to the Grateful Dead, but they turned it down.

The ship used by the Canadian Secret Service was John Wayne's personal yacht, the Wild Goose.

Critical reception
The film was a commercial failure, but received positive reviews from critics. , it holds a 77% rating on Rotten Tomatoes based on 22 reviews.

Deleted scenes
Some television prints and videocassette versions of the film were missing some of the songs written and performed by Clear Light with Barry McGuire, with the songs replaced with generic stock instrumental music because of music copyright issues. The 2004 DVD release restored the songs.

A scene missing from current editions of the film involves Schaefer meeting his lover Nan seemingly by chance at a 1960s-style underground movie.

In popular culture
The internet fax service The Phone Company took its name from this film.

See also
List of American films of 1967
List of films featuring surveillance
List of films featuring hallucinogens

References

External links
 
 
 
 
 

1967 films
1960s black comedy films
1960s spy comedy films
American black comedy films
American political comedy films
American political satire films
Cold War films
Films scored by Lalo Schifrin
Films about psychiatry
Films directed by Theodore J. Flicker
Paramount Pictures films
Films about telephony
1967 comedy films
1967 drama films
Films set in the White House
Films set in Washington, D.C.
Films set in New Jersey
Films about the KGB
Films about Canada–United States relations
Films shot in Los Angeles
Films shot in New York City
1960s English-language films
1960s American films